Nassau is the second studio album by American indie rock band The Sea and Cake. It was released on March 27, 1995 by Thrill Jockey.

Track listing

Personnel
The Sea and Cake
Sam Prokop — vocals, guitar
Archer Prewitt — guitar, organ
Eric Claridge — bass, piano
John McEntire — percussion, EMS VCS3 synthesizer, organ, electric piano
Additional musicians
Marnie Christensen — violin
Poppy Brandes — cello

References

The Sea and Cake albums
1995 albums
Thrill Jockey albums